Daniel Sackheim (born in 1962) is an American television and film director, producer, and photographer. Sackheim has produced and directed for The X-Files, Law & Order, House and NYPD Blue. He also directed The Walking Dead, The Americans, and Ozark, for which he was nominated for an Emmy Award. He has won a Primetime Emmy Award as a director and been nominated twice for his work as a producer and director. Sackheim directed the third and fourth episodes of the sixth season of Game of Thrones.

Life and career 
Daniel Sackheim was born to a Jewish family in Los Angeles, the son of screenwriter William Sackheim and his wife JoAnne (née Cohen). His brother Drew Sackheim is a fashion photographer. He is married to Leslie Sackheim; they have two children, Josh and Emma, and live in Encino, California.

Sackheim's career began with a role as an assistant film editor on the 1984 John Cassavetes film Love Streams, before he found work as a music supervisor and associate producer on the NBC series Miami Vice.

Sackheim's first time as a director was on "Mushrooms", a 1991 episode from the premiere season of the television series Law & Order. Sackheim later went on to produce the pilot episode of The X-Files and direct the pilot episode of Harsh Realm. Sackheim also served as an executive producer for the 2005 series Night Stalker, a remake of the 1970s series Kolchak: The Night Stalker; and again as executive producer for the 2012 series The Finder. Sackheim directed the pilot episode of NBC's Hawaii and the television films Homeland Security and The Lottery. Sackheim made his feature film directing debut on 2001's The Glass House. In 1999, he signed an overall deal with 20th Century Fox Television.

From 2010 Sackheim has directed a number of episodes of high rating AMC series The Walking Dead, and since 2013 has also worked as a producer on the FX series The Americans which was listed in the American Film Institute Awards 2013 best ten television programs of the year; as well as serving as executive producer for the 2012 series The Finder. He has also directed three episodes of Jack Ryan.

On July 21, 2020, he and producer Tony To founded Bedrock Entertainment with ITV Studios America as partner.

Awards 
Sackheim's work has earned him one Primetime Emmy Award and three additional Emmy nominations. In 1994, Sackheim won the Primetime Emmy Award for Outstanding Directing for a Drama Series, having been nominated for his work on the NYPD Blue episode "Tempest in a C-Cup". His three other nominations have both been for Outstanding Drama Series in the role of producer—for Law & Order in 1992, and for House in 2007. and outstanding directing for Ozark in 2018.

Filmography

Film

Television

Footnotes

External links 

American film directors
American television directors
American film producers
American Jews
Place of birth missing (living people)
American television producers
Living people
Emmy Award winners
1962 births